Oregon Ballot Measure 92 was a ballot measure in the U.S. state of Oregon to determine whether or not to enact a "law requiring the labeling of genetically engineered foods produced and sold in Oregon". Measure 92 was close enough to trigger a recount, and ultimately did not pass with 50.3% of the state voting against labeling GMOs.

Polling

Results

References

2014 in biotechnology
Genetically modified organisms in agriculture
2014 Oregon ballot measures